The Balboa Island Car Ferry is a ferry service in Newport Beach, California.

The ferry boats travel under 1,000 feet from Balboa Island to the Balboa Peninsula (Fun Zone area) and vice versa, reaching a top speed of four miles per hour.  The speed limit in the harbor is 5 miles per hour, and the ferry docks about every 5 minutes.  A full-time captain will dock the ferry at least 22,500 times every year, traveling at least 3,200 miles every year.

History

In 1919 Joseph Allan Beek obtained the rights from the city of Newport Beach to provide a ferry service across the Newport Harbor between Balboa Island and the Balboa Peninsula. Before starting the ferry service Beek owned The Ark. The Ark consisted of a giant rowboat with a small engine which Beek used as his first ferry vessel. The Ark carried oars in the event of engine failure. There was no regularly scheduled service and customers telephoned Beek when they needed a ride across the harbor.

In 1919 Beek charged 5 cents per person. Three years after commencing operation, Beek built the Fat Ferry. This vessel held 20 passengers. Beek later built a small one car barge which the Fat Ferry pushed across in front of it.

In the 1950s Beek built three double-ended wooden boats for his ferry service: the Admiral, the Commodore, and the Captain. These three boats remain in service and have transported over two million persons.  Each ferry holds three cars and 75 people. , the Beek family charges $1.25 per adult, $2.25 per vehicle, $.50 for children ages 5–11, $1.50 for adults on bikes, $.75 for children on bikes, and $1.75 for motorcycles. Children under the age of 5 are free.

The ferry boats need constant maintenance but this does not usually interrupt service. For two weeks in 2008 the ferry service shut down for an extended period, for the first time in 50 years, to rebuild the automobile ramp leading to the boats. In January 2022 another partial outage for construction caused the ferry to accept only foot traffic, but not vehicles.

Currently, Beek’s three sons run the business and it has been in the family for nearly 100 years.

Appearances in popular culture

The ferry was featured in the 1949 movie The Reckless Moment starring James Mason and Joan Bennett.

The ferry was also featured by Huell Howser in California's Gold Episode 10009.

Gallery

Other Nearby Historic Sights

 Balboa Fun Zone (Est. 1936).  Rides, food, shops, merry-go-round, and Ferris wheel.
 Balboa Pavilion (Est. 1906). Newport Beach's most famous landmark.
Balboa Pier (Est. 1906). Built as a sister project with the Balboa Pavilion to attract landbuyers to the Balboa Peninsula.
Rendezvous Ballroom (Est. 1928, destroyed by fire 1966). A plaque marks the former site.

See also
Catalina Flyer, a larger passenger-only ferry service from the Balboa Peninsula to Catalina Island

References

Further reading

"Balboa Island Ferry Rides Now 20 for $1", Los Angeles Times, June 13, 1954.
"Skipper Tells Hazards of 2-Minute Crossing", Los Angeles Times, July 19, 1964.
"Balboa ferry service began with rowboat-size craft", Orange County Register, May 22, 1989.
"Balboa ferry offers rare, old-style transportation", Orange County Register, August 19, 1989.
"Balboa Island residents make waves about ferry traffic", Orange County Register, August 25, 1989.
"Hidden treasure ferrying between Balboas: a short hop for big fun costs a buck or less", Orange County Register, October 4, 1997.
"Orange Slices: Classic OC ferry tale", Orange County Register, May 29, 2005
Terence Loose, "Happy Birthday Newport Beach", Coast Magazine, October 2005.

External links 
http://balboaislandferry.com/

External Images
https://web.archive.org/web/20050914065801/http://www.talesofbalboa.com/prints/balboaferrylanding.htm
https://web.archive.org/web/20061007083049/http://www.balboapavilion.com/pavilion_bird_Brown_pelican_03s.jpg
https://web.archive.org/web/20050221154838/http://talesofbalboa.com/prints/welcometobalboa.htm
http://www.transit-rider.com/ca.orangecounty/balboaislandferry.cfm
https://web.archive.org/web/20101230025057/http://www.balboaisland.com/balboa-ferry/

Historical External Images
http://www.talesofbalboa.com/arc1999/cards120.gif
History postcards showing the Balboa Island Ferry

Ferries of California
Transportation in Orange County, California
Newport Beach, California